Pablo "Ambo" David Angeles (born Pablo Ángeles y David; August 17, 1889 – May 16, 1965) was a Filipino magistrate and statesman. During his career, he became a judge, a member of the Philippine House of Representatives, Governor of Pampanga and a member of the Senate of the Philippines. With the Spanish system of nomenclature still in use at the time of the American period, his name was rendered as "Pablo Angeles David", with his maternal surname occupying the last position in his full name.

Early life and education 

David Angeles was born in the town of Bacolor, Pampanga in the house of Carlos Angeles y de los Reyes (of Barrio San Vicente) and Ceferina David y Mesina (of Barrio San Isidro) on August 17, 1889.

Early on (up to 1901), Pablo displayed brilliance as a juvenile student at the private Spanish school (equivalent to present primary and intermediate school) of Don Modesto Joaquin, a former Katipunero. His other students would later grow as famous personalities like Justice Jose Gutierrez David, Nicolas Dayrit and Benigno Aquino, Sr., grandfather of the former Philippine President Benigno Simeon C. Aquino III. He earned the degree of Bachelor of Arts in 1906 at Liceo de Manila and the degree in law in 1909 at Escuela de Derecho, the nation's leading law school.[5] In 1910, at the age of 20, he passed the Philippine Bar Examination, placing Third, (after Don Felix Gurrea, #1 and Don Jose Escaler, #2) and became the youngest person to qualify the Philippine Bar Examination. He had to wait another year to take his oath of law.

Political career 

David Angeles chose to serve his province, Pampanga. From 1911 to 1912, he was appointed as Justice of the Peace for Sasmuan, Santa Rita and his hometown of Bacolor. From 1913 to 1915, he served as Deputy Provincial Fiscal. He was elected for three years as a provincial councilor in 1916 and later in 1918 became chairman of the Census Board. In 1919 he was elected to the House of Representatives for the 1st District of Pampanga.

David Angeles became acting Governor of Pampanga at the age of 27 when Don Honorio Ventura was appointed as Secretary of the Interior, being the number one board member. He was elected as governor in 1931 and was re-elected in 1934.

He retired to private practice in 1937. But in 1939, he was appointed by the late President Manuel L. Quezon as Circuit or CFI Judge of Maasin, the birthplace of his wife, and later was transferred to Bulacan, where World War II overtook him.

During the first days of the Japanese Occupation, he was practically forced to serve either as Governor of Pampanga, or as Circuit (Court of First Instance or CFI) Judge of Bulacan. He chose the latter as being less sinecure, serving therein as such in Malolos, Bulacan and later in Pampanga.

In early December 1944, he was kidnapped in his home by the Hukbalahap/HMB Commander Silvestre Liwanag a.k.a. Linda Bie, who delivered him with Luis Taruc to the HMB headquarters at Santa Cruz Pambilog. Pedro Taruc, Luis M. Taruc's uncle, demanded his cooperation by lending his reputation by announcing to the people that the HUKBALAHAP must be supported. Adamantly, he refused. Ciceron, who joined Don Pablo replacing Luis, negotiated that, in exchange for his father's release, he would provide food and supplies. This he did without the knowledge of Don Pablo who would not have given his consent.

Within days of his return to his home, the Japanese Kempeitai seized him as "The Father of Guerrillas" in Pampanga and brought him to Consunji Street, Santo Rosario, San Fernando, at the ancestral house of Godofredo Yabut Rodriguez and Victoria Singian Hizon. Immediately, the late Don Jose Urquico and the late Don Sergio Aquino, relatives of Don Benigno Aquino, Sr., obtained custody of him from the Kempeitai head, Colonel Suzuki, who was their friend and guaranteed to keep him incomunicado in Concepcion, Tarlac.

The reason for the Kempeitai's action was that no prominent personality taken by the HMB had ever surfaced alive except for David Angeles.

They came to the conclusion that David Angeles must have agreed to work for them.

Doña Concepcion languished at the arrest of her husband by the Kempeitai. She refused to sleep, eat, drink nor take her medicines for diabetes and asthma; she succumbed on December 24, 1944. When news reached Tarlac of this, David Angeles was allowed to go home to Bacolor, Pampanga, with the understanding that he would return to Concepcion,Tarlac. But he never did. After burying his wife on December 26, 1944, he asked for the Catholic parish priest, Father Andres Bituin, to hear his general confession for two whole days, renouncing his 33rd Degree Freemasonry. He announced to his family that he had decided to fight the PKP-HMB, which was organized by his former confreres.

When the family escaped the path of the battles of liberation, David Angeles was again kidnapped by the HMB Commander Silvestre Liwanag alias "Linda Bie" at Barrio Pulung Masle, Guagua, Pampanga in February 1945 and again brought to Santa Cruz Pambilog, San Luis. Again, Ciceron accompanied him.  Ciceron tried to convince him to give his word with fingers crossed, i.e. under DURESS. Don Pablo refused. With supreme coolness, he did not lose sleep despite the certain execution.

By God's grace, word got to the Sixth U.S. Army's Counter-Intelligence Corps (CIC) at San Fernando, Pampanga by a 12-year-old boy who overheard the HMB plan to execute him to shut him up on the Communist machinations and ran the whole night. With the boy as a guide, two American officers (Mutt and Jeff according to Ciceron) jumped into a jeep with a big radio with long antenna and drove pellmell to Barrio Santa Cruz Pambilog. Dropping off the boy, they entered the HMB camp and demanded to see David Angeles but the HMB commanders denied he was there. The two officers spoke with cold certainty that he was there and that in 24 hours, the U.S. Sixth Army would mount an all-out assault against their headquarters should Don Pablo not present himself to them with sound mind and body by twelve noon the next day. The HMB relented and led them to the hut where he and his son, Ciceron, were detained.  While speaking loudly on how-is-the-weather niceties, they exchanged hand-written notes.

The next day, the HMB offered the well-known white-starred chevrolet of the popular Tarlac Japanese-sponsored Governor Feliciano B. Gardiner and his three companions whom the HMB kidnapped and executed at Apalit on December 7, 1944, as the vehicle in which they would travel to San Fernando. Ciceron refused anticipating that the anti-communist Filipino Guerrillas who suspected the HMB might ambush them. Instead, David Angeles and his son, Ciceron, rode a horse-drawn caretela at dawn to the CIC headquarters.

Many years later, Ciceron recalled sadly that they mutually recognized and hailed many prominent citizens from all over Pampanga there in a weird kind of last gathering as in an execution camp, but they never saw them again years later. As this is being written, there is a national amnesia of this killing field except for Luis M. Taruc's letter to President Manuel A. Roxas complaining about the "fascist governor of Pampanga", and boasting in the same letter that they executed 30,000 fascist traitors.

After the Liberation from the Japanese in World War II, the late President Sergio Osmeña Sr. re-appointed him as Circuit or CFI Judge of Bulacan.

Nobody wanted to accept the position of Governor of Pampanga as the Pampanga capital and town halls were occupied by HMB Mayors and bearded dissidents festooned with ammo bandoleers, not only in Pampanga, but in the entire Tarlac and many other Central Luzon cities and towns. The late President Manuel Roxas prevailed upon David Angeles to restore the provincial government as Acting Governor of Pampanga in 1945. Beginning from his home town of Bacolor, he formed the Civilian Guards and wrested control of the provincial capital and the town centers (poblacion) and drove the Hukbalahap/HMB to the hinterlands (Mount Arayat, the Candaba swamp and Zambales mountains). He sent truckloads of arms and ammunition seized from captured and surrendered HMB's to the Civilian Guards of Tarlac under Jose Feliciano. In 1946, he was elected Governor of Pampanga. In one year of administration, he was able to pacify the province sufficiently to enable the farmers to work the farms and produce enough for themselves and their landlords.

The late President Manuel Roxas again prevailed upon him to run for the Philippine Senate in 1947.

He was elected and he served for six years, until 1953. As a senator, he always stood up in the Senate for an "Mailed Fist" policy against the Hukbong Mapagpalaya ng Pilipinas in contrast to the voices urging appeasement.

As a senator, he was known for his fiery speeches. One such example is of April 1950 expose when he contested President President Elpidio Quirino's announcement that the Hukbalahap rebels had already been decimated. He then revealed that a massacre occurred in his hometown Bacolor, the Maliwalu Massacre (April 7, 1950 Good Friday) which was perpetrated by members of the Civilian Guards/Serrano private army in retaliation for the death of one of their commanders, Captain Nonong Serrano.

In the Chinese Immigration Quota Scandal, Senator Pablo Angeles y David was one of the four solons who were cleared of guilt by the Senate Blue Ribbon Committee headed by then Senator Lorenzo M. Tañada.

Personal life 

His first wife was Concepcion "Conching" Galang Baro (Dec 30, 1894 – Dec 24, 1944), a mestiza of Basque descent. They had six children, named Luis "Sito" Baro Angeles (Jan 22, 1911 – May 3, 1995), Ciceron Valentin "Aring" Baro Angeles, Sr. (Feb 14, 1913 – Jan 14, 1996), Estrella "Nining" Baro Angeles-Romero (Sep 5, 1915 – Dec 20, 1994), Hernani "Nani" Baro Angeles (Apr 23, 1917 – Apr 2001), Maria Divina Baro Angeles (1918 – 1920) and Florita "Flor" Baro Angeles-Valenzuela (May 31, 1919 – Apr 2014).

In 1948 then 58 years old, he married Estela "Telang" Galura y Cano (Sep 27, 1927 – Feb 25, 1960), a local beauty queen. They had five children: Pablo "Boy" Galura Angeles II (Jul 11, 1949 – Nov 2013), Estela "Baby" Galura Angeles-Lopez (Feb 8, 1951), Pablo "Amblit" Galura Angeles III (Sep 11, 1952), Maria Corazon "Khorrie" Galura Angeles-Schwaerzler (Mar 5, 1954), and Carlos "Titus" Galura Angeles (Jan 7, 1956).

David Angeles served his province and stayed in Bacolor until he suffered a stroke. He spent his later years of life with his family in 1571 Aragon Street corner Governor Forbes Avenue (now Lacson Avenue), Sampaloc, Manila and Tendido Street, San Jose, Quezon City until his passing on May 16, 1965. Beloved by his hometown, a statue of him was erected at the plaza in front of the famous San Guillermo Parish Church in Cabambangan, Bacolor.

Legacy 

On February 21, 1986, at the Inauguration of a monument to honor Don Pablo Angeles y David at the Plaza in front of San Guillermo Church. Retired town councilor Turiano Cenzon distributed this brief biography written by him for the interment on May 22, 1965, at the Catholic Cemetery at San Guillermo Church, Cabambangan, Bacolor, Pampanga.

BIOGRAPHY OF THE LATE FORMER SENATOR PABLO ANGELES DAVID

Pablo Angeles y David was born on August 17, 1889, in an obscure barrio of Bacolor, Pampanga, namely San Isidro, to Carlos Angeles y de los Reyes and Ceferina David y Mesina, a couple of modest means.

Upon reaching school age, he attended the Don Modesto Joaquin School (to take courses which may be now equivalent to primary and intermediate grades) at Cabambangan, Bacolor. Having graduated, he proceeded to Manila to enroll in a "Escuela Secundaria", which is equivalent to high school and preparatory school.

Having graduated therefrom, he took up law at the Escuela de Derecho, graduating as number two in his class in 1910, with the first honors going to the late Don Jose Escaler, and immediately took up the Supreme Court examinations, passing among the top three, namely the late Don Felix Gurrea, the late Don Jose Escaler and himself, in the same order. He passed the Bar examinations and received the certificate of the Supreme Court in 1910 upon reaching the age of 21.

In early 1910 at twenty years of age,, he had for his first wife Concepcion Baro y Galang (15 years old), the youngest of five and only daughter of Don Jose "Pepe" Baro and Dominga "Ingga" Galang with whom he had six children. In 1948, he again took unto himself a second wife, Estela Galura y Cano, the youngest of Six and only daughter of the long-time mayor and Fil-American War hero, Manuel Galura. She was twenty years old then, while Don.Pablo was 58 years old. With her, he had five children.

Beginning public life early, he was a municipal councilor for two terms, in 1903-1909, of his native town of Bacolor, with the late Fil-American War hero Felix Galura y Napao, as Municipal Mayor. Don Felix was the father of Manuel Galura.

At the young age of 17, and before he took the Supreme Court examinations, he was already a Justice of the Peace of Bacolor, Pampanga.

In 1914, he was appointed as Assistant Provincial Fiscal of Pampanga, serving in this capacity until 1916, when he resigned from said position to run successfully for membership (Vocal) of the Provincial Board of Pampanga for one term, or up to 1919, with late Don Honorio Ventura as Provincial Governor. The popular American Governor General Francis Burton Harrison appointed Don Honorio Ventura to be Chief of the Executive Bureau of the Department of Interior to replace Atty. Felipe Agoncillo y Encarnación who resigned from the position.  Don Pablo took the post of governor of Pampanga. (That is how Don Pablo assumed the governorship of Pampanga four times.  He was regularly elected twice in 1931 and 1934. The first time,  he assumed the position by its vacancy.  At the last time in 1945, the Communist insurgents rendered the civil government of Pampanga helpless force majeure by force of arms.)

In 1919, he ran for Congress, winning the seat for the late 1st District of Pampanga for one term, or up to 1922, when he temporarily retired from public life, and thereafter, engaged in the private practice of law with some success.

In 1931, he was again prevailed upon by admirers and friends and by the leaders of the Nacionalista Party to run for Governor of Pampanga against the late Don Pedro Abad Santos.  He won by a good majority and served his terms until 1934, the year of great controversy on the Hare-Hawes-Cutting Law obtained from the U.S. Congress by the so-called OsRox Mission (the late former Presidents Sergio Osmeña and Manuel A. Roxas).  He ran for re-election for Governor, under the banner of the "Pros" of the Nacionalista Party, against Doctor Lazaro Yambao of the "Antis" of the same Party and the late Don Pedro Abad Santos of the Frente Popular, and won by overwhelming majority, serving his second term until 1937, when he again chose not to run and to retire temporarily from public life.

But it was not long for him to do so, as in 1939, he was appointed by the late President Manuel L. Quezon as Circuit Judge of Maasin, Leyte and later was transferred to Tarlac, where World War II overtook him.

During the first days of the Japanese, he was practically forced to serve either as Governor of Pampanga, or as Circuit Judge of Bulacan.  He chose the latter as being less sinecure, serving therein as such in Malolos, Bulacan and later in Pampanga until he was incarcerated by the Japanese Kempeitai at San Fernando, Pampanga, for suspicion as the Father of the Guerrillas in Pampanga.  He was later recovered from the custody of the Kempeitai by the late Don Jose Urquico and the late Don Sergio Aquino and was exiled in Concepcion, Tarlac under their custody.

Due to the death of his beloved wife, Doña Concepcion, on December 24, 1944, he was allowed to go home to Bacolor, Pampanga, with the understanding that he would return to Tarlac.  But he never did, and he escaped into the hinterlands of Pampanga until liberation.

In 1945, the late President Sergio Osmeña re-appointed him as Circuit Judge of Bulacan.

In 1946, he was prevailed upon by the late President Manuel A. Roxas to accept the Acting Governorship of Pampanga because nobody wanted to accept the position due to the precarious condition of peace and order not only in Pampanga but in the entire Central Luzon caused by the dissidence of the Hukbalahap Movement (Hukbong Bayan Laban sa Hapon, transformed to Hukbong Mapagpalaya ng Bayan or "HMB", the military arm of the Partido Komunista ng Pilipinas or "PKP").  In one year of administration, he was able to pacify the province sufficiently to enable the farmers to work the farms and produce enough for themselves and their landlords.

In 1947, he was again prevailed upon by the late President Roxas to run for Senator of the Philippines under the banner of the Liberal Party and won (#7 out of 24 elected), serving his term of six years until 1953, fighting for a "mailed fist policy" by the Government against the Huks, and at the same time denouncing the atrocities by the government and Armed Forces against the Huks, such as the "Maliwalu Massacre" in Bacolor, Pampanga, and the "Panampanan Massacre" in Tarlac.

In 1953, although reluctant to run for re-election as Senator because he was already sickly, having had a severe stroke in 1951, he was prevailed upon by the late Pres. Elpidio Quirino y Rivera and the late Speaker Eugenio Perez to run still with the Liberal Party (against the Nacionalista Party with Ramon Magsaysay y del Fierro as Party Bearer) and lost, for the first time, his last political contest.

Senator Eulogio A. Rodriguez, Sr. "Amang", party head of the Nacionalista Party, tasked Senators Fernando H. Lopez and Gil J. Puyat to convince Angeles David to join the Nacionalista's "sure-win" Senatorial Ticket. David Angeles refused in order to preserve the two-party system; which he believed to be a safeguard against dictatorial tendencies. Instead of campaigning for re-election, he attended the Interparliamentary Union (IPU) Conference in Berne, Switzerland.

Many were the beneficiaries all over the Philippines of the prerogative of the various public positions that he held, and one of those benefited is his native town of Bacolor, which now has a new Municipal Hall, a Puericulture Center and progressive trade school, known as the "Don Honorio Ventura Memorial School of Arts and Trade." Now, it has been upgraded to a university.

He was a civic-spirited citizen, having been one of the founders of the "Aguman 33", the "Old Legs", "Katipunan", and others. While in public office, he never enriched himself and died on May 16, 1965, practically a poor man.

– Retired Bacolor Councilor Turiano Cenzon (May 20, 1965)

See also 
 Pampanga
 Bacolor, Pampanga
 Legislative districts of Pampanga
 Congress of the Philippines
 Senate of the Philippines

References

1889 births
1965 deaths
Filipino judges
Governors of Pampanga
Members of the Pampanga Provincial Board
Members of the House of Representatives of the Philippines from Pampanga
Senators of the 1st Congress of the Philippines
Senators of the 2nd Congress of the Philippines
People from Pampanga
Members of the Philippine Legislature
20th-century Filipino lawyers